The Northern Counties Textile Trades Federation was a trade union federation in northern England.

History
The federation was founded in 1906.  By 1907, it brought together unions representing 126,700 members.  Despite its name, it only included unions representing workers in the cotton industry; the wool industry and textile finishing were instead covered by the National Association of Unions in the Textile Trade.  Another similar organisation, the United Textile Factory Workers' Association, devoted itself to political work, and two of its members (the Amalgamated Association of Card and Blowing Room Operatives and the Amalgamated Association of Operative Cotton Spinners) never joined the federation.

By 1960, the federation's members were:

 Amalgamated Association of Beamers, Twisters and Drawers (Hand and Machine)
 Amalgamated Tape Sizers' Friendly Protection Society
 Amalgamated Textile Warehousemen's Association
 Amalgamated Weavers' Association
 General Union of Loom Overlookers
 Lancashire Amalgamated Tape Sizers' Friendly Society
 Lancashire and Yorkshire Warp Dressers' Association

General Secretaries
1906: Tom Shaw
1919: Luke Bates
1943: Andrew Naesmith
1953: Lewis Wright
1968: Harry Kershaw
c.1970: Arthur Howcroft
1971: Fred Hague

References

National trade union centres of the United Kingdom
Trade unions established in 1906
1906 establishments in the United Kingdom
Cotton industry trade unions